Stožok is a village and municipality in Detva District, in the Banská Bystrica Region of central Slovakia.

References

External links
http://stozok.e-obce.sk
http://www.stozok.sk

Villages and municipalities in Detva District